The Wreckage is the sixth studio album by Will Hoge, released September 29, 2009 by Rykodisc.

Critical reception

Andrew Leahey of AllMusic says "he's rarely sounded as convincing as he does here, having suffered enough misery during the previous 12 months to make his blues-influenced songwriting all the more persuasive."

Lizza Connor Bowen of American Songwriter writes, "Will Hoge’s aptly titled The Wreckage was born after the Nashville rock and roller was sidelined by an auto accident in 2008. With free time to recover and ruminate, Hoge bows a melodic collection with lyrics that lean more toward introspection than his previous work."

Steve Leftridge of PopMatters gives the album 6 out of a possible 10 stars and says, "The record starts with a couple of terrific rockers, the thumping "Hard to Love", about the disconnect between needing someone and the urge to bail out “in this damn world of lies”, and he backs up such a sentiment with a procession of emotionally raw songs. "Long Gone" is a Tom Petty-style burner that follows the record’s chief theme, that love is a twisted blessing because it lies just outside our reach"

Sid Smith  of the BBC writes, "Given the dire circumstances from which it was born, The Wreckage is understandably a triumphant record. But it comes complete with enough self-reflection to avoid coming across as yet another bright and breezy album about cars and girls."

Anthony Kuzminski of AntiMusic gives the album 3½ smiley faces and concludes his review with, "Will Hoge's The Wreckage may be the year's most authentic rock n' roll album; it is a forthright, sweeping and transfixing record that will haunt, console and rescue your soul even at your darkest hour."

Paste Magazine's review of the album says, "Hoge, the Nashville native, creates climates that are frustrated sets of spaces and people, just trying to bang their heads through their walls so that they can finally get over to the other side, where there's still no guarantee that things are going to be improved, but they'll be different and potentially better than they are now. He sings about false hope and about being sold tonics that just don't work. There are no active ingredients to be found in them and they wind up to be empty calories – nothing to chew on or digest."

Track listing

Track information and credits adapted from Discogs and AllMusic.

Musicians

Will Hoge – Celeste, Composer, Acoustic Guitar, Electric Guitar, Percussion, Lead Vocals, Background Vocals, Harmonica
Adam Beard – Bass, Horn, Background Vocals
Sigurdur Birkis – Drums, Percussion
Pat Buchanan – Acoustic Guitar, Baritone Guitar, Electric Guitar
Kyle Cook – Electric Guitar, Background Vocals
Ken Coomer – Drums, Percussion
Jen Gunderman – Hammond B3, Mellotron
Tony Harrell – Piano
Scotty Huff – Background Vocals
Devin Malone – Cello, 12 String Guitar, Acoustic Guitar, Electric Guitar, Hammond B3, Pedal Steel, Piano, Wurlitzer Piano
Tim Marks – Bass
Ashley Monroe – Vocals
Kenny Vaughan – Electric Guitar
Michael Webb – Hammond B3, Piano

Production

Ken Coomer – Producer, Engineer
Charlie Brocco – Producer, Engineer
Patrick Miller – Engineer
Jim Scott – Mixing
Andrew Southam – Photography
Greg Calbi – Mastering
Jon Sheperd – Production Manager
Doug Buttleman – Management
Jamie Hoyt-Vitale – Art Direction, Design
Ruby Marchand – A&R

Charts

References

External links
Will Hoge Official Site

2011 albums
Will Hoge albums
Rykodisc albums